Limnia georgiae is a species of marsh fly in the family Sciomyzidae.

References

Sciomyzidae
Articles created by Qbugbot
Insects described in 1920